"White Iverson" is the debut single by American rapper and singer Post Malone. It was released through Republic Records on August 14, 2015, as the lead single from his debut studio album, Stoney (2016). It was originally released on February 4, 2015, through Malone's SoundCloud account. Malone produced and wrote it alongside FKi 1st and Rex Kudo. It peaked at number 14 on the Billboard Hot 100 songs chart in the United States. The single is widely known as the first that gained him mainstream attention.

Background and release
Post moved to Los Angeles and met FKi 1st, who introduced him to Rex Kudo, who in turn helped him produce "White Iverson". Post recorded the song two days after he wrote it. He thought of the name after getting braids in his hair, thinking he looked like a "White Iverson", a reference to the professional basketball player, Allen Iverson. Upon completion in February 2015, it was uploaded to Post's SoundCloud account. It quickly brought him attention from record labels, gaining over a million plays the month it was uploaded. He decided to sign with Republic Records.

Music video
The song's accompanying music video premiered on July 19, 2015, on Post Malone's YouTube account. Since its release, the music video has received over 1 billion views on YouTube.

Post said in an episode of the h3h3Productions podcast that the music video cost $5,000 and took only a day to make. He also commented that Rolls-Royce Motor Cars contacted him following the release, stating he was incorrectly using the car.

Remix
The official remix was released on December 7, 2015, featuring French Montana and Rae Sremmurd. Lil Wayne also released a remix to "White Iverson" entitled "Too Young" for his mixtape No Ceilings 2. The song also shares the same title of Malone's second official single, which is, as well, the second single from his debut album Stoney. Rapper Montana of 300 released a remix titled "White Iverson/Milly Rock Remix".

Chart performance
"White Iverson" debuted at number 84 on the Billboard Hot 100 for the chart dated September 26, 2015, and peaked at number 14 for the chart dated January 23, 2016. The song was certified 5× Platinum by the Recording Industry Association of America (RIAA) for sales of five million digital copies. Post Malone has referred to this song as his only good song in many different live occasions, pointing out his affection for the piece.

Charts

Weekly charts

Year-end charts

Certifications

References

External links

2015 debut singles
2015 songs
Post Malone songs
Songs written by Post Malone
Songs written by FKi 1st
Song recordings produced by Post Malone
Cloud rap songs
Republic Records singles